Giovanni Dekeyser (born 10 December 1976 in Bruges) is a Belgian football midfielder who currently plays for East Flanders lower league side K.F.C. Eeklo.

He made his senior debut for Cercle Brugge in second division in a 1–1 draw against K.F.C. Lommel S.K., on 17 August 1996. Giovanni Dekeyser became Cercle Brugge top scorer in 2001 and was voted player of the year. This earned him a transfer to Royal Antwerp F.C., who then competed at the highest level of Belgian football. Dekeyser returned to Cercle Brugge after one season where he became second division champions in May 2003.

Other teams of Giovanni Dekeyser include Deinze, Oostende, K.S.V. Bornem, Sint-Eloois-Winkel, Maldegem and Eeklo.

External links
 Giovanni Dekeyser player info at the official Cercle Brugge site 
 Giovanni Dekeyser player info at antwerpsupporter.be 
 Cerclemuseum.be

Notes

Living people
1976 births
Belgian footballers
Association football midfielders
Belgian Pro League players
Footballers from Bruges
Cercle Brugge K.S.V. players
Royal Antwerp F.C. players
K.V. Oostende players
K.M.S.K. Deinze players
Sint-Eloois-Winkel Sport players